Manly was an electoral district of the Legislative Assembly in the Australian state of Queensland from 1986 to 1992.

The district was based in the eastern suburbs of Brisbane and named for the suburb of Manly.

Members for Manly

Election results

See also
 Electoral districts of Queensland
 Members of the Queensland Legislative Assembly by year
 :Category:Members of the Queensland Legislative Assembly by name

References

Former electoral districts of Queensland
Constituencies established in 1986
1986 establishments in Australia
Constituencies disestablished in 1992
1992 disestablishments in Australia